Goofy and Wilbur is a 1939 animated cartoon short produced by Walt Disney Productions and released by RKO Radio Pictures on March 17, 1939. Although the cartoon is billed as a Mickey Mouse cartoon (as said on the theatrical poster), it was the first cartoon which featured Goofy in a solo role without Mickey Mouse and/or Donald Duck.

In this cartoon Goofy goes fishing with his pet grasshopper, Wilbur, only for persistent bad luck to befall the duo.  An anthropomorphic dog Goofy and his grasshopper friend Wilbur (who has limited ability to think or feel), catch fish in a net using Wilbur as bait. This cartoon has a violent depiction because Wilbur is nearly, or perhaps actually, killed.

Plot
Goofy and his friend Wilbur, a tame grasshopper, team up for a fishing expedition.  Goofy decides to use Wilbur as bait, but has second thoughts when he realizes too late, that his friend might actually get eaten by a fish. Goofy has a row boat and a net, but no fishing rod. Wilbur, being a live bug, becomes the perfect choice for bait inside the net, which will lure fish when the boat approaches.

Wilbur's life depends on the hapless and incompetent Goofy to save the little bug, who becomes the bait for a half-dozen fish. As Wilbur gets tricked again and again, he is even swallowed by a frog; then that frog gets eaten by a stork, all while Goofy desperately attempts a chasing rescue.  In the end Wilbur hatches out of the stork egg, and to Goofy's relief, is unharmed.

Reception
The Film Daily wrote, "Wilbur, the grasshopper, is a new character among Disney creations, and will immediately have millions of cheering fans.. The affection between him and his master, Goofy, is something beautiful to behold... The characterization of Wilbur is so real, that one seems to have known him a long time. All Disney followers will welcome him."

Voice cast
 Goofy: Danny Webb

Releases
 – Original theatrical release
 – Disneyland, episode #2.22: "On Vacation" (TV)
 – Donald Duck's Summer Magic (theatrical)
 – Good Morning, Mickey!, episode #59 (TV)
 – Turner & Hooch (Australian theatrical re-release)
 – Mickey's Mouse Tracks, episode #46 (TV)
 – Donald's Quack Attack, episode #32 (TV)
 – The Ink and Paint Club, episode #1.25: "Goofy Goofs Around" (TV)

Home media
The short was released on December 2, 2002 on Walt Disney Treasures: The Complete Goofy.

Additional releases include:
 – "Mickey Mouse and Donald Duck Cartoon Collections Volume Two" (laserdisc)
 – "Walt Disney's Funny Factory with Goofy" (DVD)
 – The Fox and the Hound 2 (DVD; special feature)

References

External links
'Goofy and Wilbur' at The Encyclopedia of Disney Animated Shorts
 

1939 films
1930s Disney animated short films
Goofy (Disney) short films
1939 animated films
Films directed by Dick Huemer
Films produced by Walt Disney
Animated films about insects
American black-and-white films
American animated short films
RKO Pictures short films
RKO Pictures animated short films
1930s American films